The French romantic composer Hector Berlioz produced significant musical and literary works. Berlioz composed mainly in the genres of opera, symphonies, choral pieces and songs. As well as these, Berlioz also produced several works that fit into hybrid genres, such as the "dramatic symphony" Roméo et Juliette and Harold in Italy, a symphony with a large solo part for viola. Berlioz's compositions are listed both by genre and by the catalogue developed by the musicologist D. Kern Holoman. Opus numbers were assigned to compositions when they published. However, they were only given to a fraction of Berlioz's work and are not in chronological order. Berlioz's writings include memoirs, technical studies and music criticism.

Musical compositions by genre
Many of Berlioz's works resist easy categorisation and assigning them to a genre is often impossible. The genres given below should be regarded as merely a guideline.

Orchestral works

Symphonies
 Symphonie fantastique (1830)
 Harold en Italie (1834)
 Roméo et Juliette (1839)
 Grande symphonie funèbre et triomphale (1840)

Overtures

 Waverley (1828)
 Le roi Lear (1831)
 Rob Roy (1831)
 Le carnaval romain (1844)
 Le corsaire (1844)
 Marche Troyenne (1864)

Concertante work
 Rêverie et caprice (Romance for violin and orchestra) (1841)

Choral and orchestral works

Operas
 Estelle et Némorin (1823; lost)
 Les francs-juges (1826-33; unperformed – survives in fragments)
 Benvenuto Cellini (1834–8)
 La nonne sanglante (1841–7; unfinished)
 Les Troyens (1856–8; final three acts performed 1863)
 Béatrice et Bénédict (1860–2)

Oratorios
 La damnation de Faust (1845-6)
 L'enfance du Christ (1850-4)

Sacred works
 Messe solenelle (1824)
 Resurrexit (1828)
 Chant sacré (1829)
 Quartetto e coro dei maggi (1832)
 Le cinq mai, chant sur la mort de l’empereur Napoléon (1835)
 Grande messe des morts (Requiem) (1837)
 Prière du matin (1846)
 Te Deum (1849)
 Meditation religieuse (1849)
 Hymne pour la consécration du nouveau tabernacle (1859)
 Veni creator (?1861-8)
 Tantum ergo (?1861-8)

Secular works
 La révolution grecque: scéne héroïque (1825)
 Le ballet des ombres (1829; withdrawn)
 Huit scènes de Faust (1828–9)
 Chant guerrier (1829)
 Chanson à boire (1829)
 Lélio, ou le retour à la vie (1831)
 Sara la baigneuse (1834)
 Les chant des Bretons (1835)
 Aubade (1839)
 Tristia (1831–44)
 Hymne à la France (1844)
 Le Chant des chemins de fer (1846)
 La menace des Francs (1848)
 L’impériale (1854)

Prix de Rome cantatas

 La mort d’Orphée (1827)
 Herminie (1828)
 Cléopâtre (1829)
 Sardanapale (1830; mostly lost)

Songs
 La dépit de la bergère (?1818-22)
 Le maure jaloux (?1818-22)
 Amitié reprends ton empire (?1818-22)
 Pleure, pauvre Colette (?1818-22)
 Canon libre à quinte (?1818-22)
 Le montagnard exilé (?1822-3)
 Toi qui l'aimas, verse des pleurs (?1822-3)

 Nocturne (?1828)
 Le pêcheur (?1828)
 Le roi de Thulé (1828)
 Neuf mélodies irlandaises (1829)
 La captive (1832)
 Je crois en vous (1834)
 Chansonette (1835)
 Les nuits d'été (1841)
 La mort d'Ophélie (1842)
 Fleurs des landes (1850)
 Feuillets d'album (1850)

Chamber music
 Albumleaf for piano (1844)
 Hymne pour l’élévation in D major for organ (1844)
 Sérénade agreste à la Madone sur le thème des pifferari romains in E flat major for organ (1844)
 Toccata in C major for organ (1844)

Arrangements
 J.J.B. Pollet: Fleure du Tage (?1817)
 Claude Joseph Rouget de Lisle: La Marseillaise (1830)
 Claude Joseph Rouget de Lisle: Chant du neuf Thermidor (1830)
 Ferdinand Huber: Sur les alpes quel délice (1833)
 Carl Maria von Weber : Recitatives for Der Freischütz (1841)
 Carl Maria von Weber: L’invitation à la valse (1841)
 Leopold de Meyer: Marche marocaine (1845)
 Traditional: Marche de Rákóczi (1846)
 Christoph Willibald Gluck: Orphée (1859)
 J.P.E. Martini: Plaisir d’amour (1859)
 Franz Schubert: Erlkönig (1860)
 Christoph Willibald Gluck: Alceste (1861)
 François Couperin: Invitation à louer Dieu (?1861-8)

Works by Holoman number
This is a list of works by Holoman number, from the Catalogue of the works of Hector Berlioz (1987) by D. Kern Holoman, the 25th volume Bärenreiter's New Berlioz edition (1967–2006) [NBE]. The volume number that the work appears in the NBE is given. Many works exist in multiple versions for different forces. Opus numbers are also given for those works that have them.

Extant works

Lost works

Unfinished works
H23C Le Cri de guerre du Brisgaw intermezzo in one act based on Les francs-juges (1833-4)
H61 Le Dernier Jour du monde oratorio (1831-3)
H72 Fête musicale funèbre à la mémoire des hommes illustres de la France (1835)
H77 Érigone intermède antique (1835-9)
H91 La Nonne sanglante opera (1841-7)

There were also several works that Berlioz planned to write mentioned in his memoirs and letters that he never wrote. These include the operas Les Noces d’or d’Obéron et de Titania, La Mort d’Hercule, Richard en Palestine, Robin-Hood, Atala, Les Noces des fées, Les Brigands, Hamlet, Méphistophélès, Roméo et Juliette, Cléopâtre, Salammbô, and an opera on the Thirty Years' War; settings of verses by Édouard Turquety and Abbé Arnaud, Canon of Poitiers; a Symphony in A Minor; and a vast symphonic poem.

Writings

Literary works
Grand traité d'instrumentation et d'orchestration moderne, Treatise on Instrumentation (Paris, 1843; revised ed. 1855)
Voyage musical en Allemagne et en Italie, Musical journey in Germany and Italy (Paris, 1844)
Les soirées de l'orchestre, Evenings with the Orchestra (Paris, 1852); ed. L. Guichard (Paris, 1968)
Le chef d’orchestre: théorie de son art, The conductor: theory of his art (Paris, 1856)
Les grotesques de la musique, The grotesques of music (Paris 1859)
À travers champs, Cross-country (Paris, 1862); ed. L. Guichard (Paris, 1971)
Mémoires, Memoirs (Paris, 1870); ed. P. Citron (Paris, 1969, 2/1991)
Les musiciens et la musique, Musicians and music, ed. A. Hallays (Paris, 1903)
ed. G. Condé: Cauchemars et passions, Nightmares and passions (Paris, 1981)

Criticism

Throughout his career Berlioz produced a large amount of music criticism, starting in 1823, writing articles in Le corsaire (1823–5), Le correspondant (1829–30), Berliner allgemeine musikalische Zeitung (1829), Revue européenne (1832), Europe littéraire (1833), Le rénovateur (1833–5),Gazette (later Revue et gazette) musicale (1834–61),Journal des débats (1834–63), Journal des artistes (1834), Monde dramatique (1835), Italie pittoresque (Paris, 1836), Chronique de Paris (1837–8),L’éclair (Brussels, 1842), L’émancipation (1843), L’artiste (1844), Monde illustré (1858–9)

Berlioz's complete music criticism is being collected and edited by l’Association Nationale Hector Berlioz as Hector Berlioz: Critique Musicale 1823–1863. The complete edition will comprise ten volumes:
Volume 1: 1823–1834, ed. by H. Robert Cohen and Yves Gérard (1996)
Volume 2: 1835–1836, ed. by Marie-Hélène Coudroy-Saghaï and Anne Bongrain (1998)
Volume 3: 1837–1838, ed. by Anne Bongrain and Marie-Hélène Coudroy-Saghaï (2001)
Volume 4: 1839–1841, ed. by Anne Bongrain and Marie-Hélène Coudroy-Saghaï (2003)
Volume 5: 1842–1844, ed. by Anne Bongrain and Marie-Hélène Coudroy-Saghaï (2004)
Volume 6: 1845–1848, ed. by Anne Bongrain and Marie-Hélène Coudroy-Saghaï (2008)
Volume 7: 1849–1851, ed. by Anne Bongrain and Marie-Hélène Coudroy-Saghaï (2014)
Volume 8: 1852–1855, ed. by Anne Bongrain and Marie-Hélène Coudroy-Saghaï (2016)
Volume 9: 1856–1859, ed. by Anne Bongrain and Marie-Hélène Coudroy-Saghaï (2018)
Volume 10: 1860–1863, ed. by Anne Bongrain and Marie-Hélène Coudroy-Saghaï (2020)

Correspondence
Nearly four thousand of Berlioz's letters have been preserved

Hector Berlioz, Correspondance Générale I: 1803- May 1832 [nos. 1-273], ed. by Pierre Citron (1972)
Hector Berlioz, Correspondance Générale II: June 1832-September 1842 [nos. 274-775], ed. by Frédéric Robert (1975)
Hector Berlioz, Correspondance Générale III: September 1842 – 1850 [nos. 776-1367], ed. by Pierre Citron (1978)
Hector Berlioz, Correspondance Générale IV: 1851-February 1855 [nos. 1368-1904], ed. by Pierre Citron, Yves Gérard and Hugh J. Macdonald (1983)
Hector Berlioz, Correspondance Générale V: March 1855-August 1859 [nos. 1905-2395], ed. by Hugh J. Macdonald and François Lesure (1989)
Hector Berlioz, Correspondance Générale VI: September 1859 – 1863 [nos. 2396-2816], ed. by Hugh J. Macdonald and François Lesure (1995)
Hector Berlioz, Correspondance Générale VII: 1864-1869 [nos. 2817-3380], ed. by Hugh J. Macdonald (2001)
Hector Berlioz: Correspondance Générale VIII: Suppléments, ed. by Hugh J. Macdonald (2003)
Nouvelles lettres de Berlioz, de sa famille, de ses contemporains, ed. Peter Bloom, Joël-Marie Fauquet, Hugh J. Macdonald and Cécile Reynaud, Actes Sud/Palazzetto Bru Zane, May 2016

References

Notes

Sources

Catalogues and bibliographies
Holoman, D. Kern. Catalogue of the Works of Hector Berlioz. Kassel: Bärenreiter, 1987. 
Hopkinson, Cecil. A Bibliography of the Musical and Literary Works of Hector Berlioz 1803–1869. Edinburgh: Bibliographical Society, 1951. 
Kapp, Julius. Berlioz: eine Biographie. Berlin, 1917. 
Langford, Jeffrey. Hector Berlioz: a Guide to Research. New York: Garland, 1989. 
Müller-Reuter, Theodor. Lexikon der deutschen Konzertliteratur. New York: Da Capo Press, 1972. 
Wright, Michael G.H. A Berlioz Bibliography. Farnborough: Saint Michael's Abbey Press, 1988

Works collections (scores)
H. Berlioz: Werke, ed. Charles Malherbe and Felix Weingartner. Leipzig: Breitkopf & Härtel, vols 1-20, 1900–10. 
New Berlioz Edition, general ed. Hugh MacDonald. Kassel: Bärenreiter, vols 1-26, 1967–2006.

External links

 
Berlioz